Mixteca Alta Formative Project  (2003–present) is an archaeological project directed by Andrew Balkansky that focuses on the Mixtec of Oaxaca, Mexico. The project, which is funded by the National Science Foundation, the National Geographic Society, and the H. John Heinz III Fund, seeks to understand Mixtec origins and their transition to urbanism. Excavations are currently taking place at the ancient site of Tayata.

Further reading

Articles 
 Balkansky, Andrew K., Gary M. Feinman, and Linda M. Nicholas. 1997. Pottery Kilns of Ancient Ejutla, Oaxaca, Mexico. Journal of Field Archaeology 24 (2):139-160.
 Balkansky, Andrew K. 1998. Urbanism and Early State Formation in the Huamelulpan Valley of Southern Mexico. Latin American Antiquity 9 (1):37-67.
 Balkansky, Andrew K., Stephen A. Kowalewski, Verónica Pérez Rodríguez, Thomas J. Pluckhahn, Charlotte A. Smith, Laura R. Stiver, Dmitri Beliaev, John F. Chamblee,Verenice Y. Heredia Espinoza, and Roberto Santos Pérez. 2000. Archaeological Survey in the Mixteca Alta of Oaxaca, Mexico. Journal of Field Archaeology 27 (4):365-389. 
 Balkansky, Andrew K., Veronica Perez Rodriguez, and Stephen A. Kowalewski. 2004. Monte Negro and the Urban Revolution in Oaxaca, Mexico. Latin American Antiquity 15 (1):33-60.
 Balkansky, Andrew K., and Michelle M. Croissier. 2009. Multicrafting in Prehispanic Oaxaca. Archeological Papers of the American Anthropological Association 19 (1):58-74.
 Borah, Woodrow. 1951. Notes on Civil Archives in the City of Oaxaca. The Hispanic American Historical Review 31 (4):723-749.
 Burland, C.A. 1957. Ancient Mexican Documents in Great Britain. Man 57:76-77.
 Chance, John K. 1976. The Urban Indian in Colonial Oaxaca. American Ethnologist 3 (4):603-632.
 Chance, John K., and William B. Taylor. 1977. Estate and Class in a Colonial City: Oaxaca in 1792. Comparative Studies in Society and History 19 (4):454-487.
 Chance, John K. 2009. Marriage Alliances among Colonial Mixtec Elites: The Villagomez Caciques of Acatlan-Petlalcingo. Ethnohistory 56:91-123.
 Cristensen, Alexander F. 1998. Colonization and Microevolution in Formative Oaxaca, Mexico. World Archaeology 30 (2):262-285.
 Feinman, Gary M., Sherman Banker, Reid F. Cooper, Glen B. Cook, and Linda M. Nicholas. 1989. A Technological Perspective on Changes in the Ancient Oaxacan Grayware Ceramic Tradition: Preliminary Results. Journal of Field Archaeology 16 (3):331-344.
 Joyce, Arthur A. 1991. Period Social Change in the Lower Rio Verde Valley, Oaxaca, Mexico. Latin American Antiquity 2 (2):126-150.
 Joyce, Arthur A. 1994. Late Formative Community Organization and Social Complexity on the Oaxaca Coast. Journal of Field Archaeology 21 (2):147-168.
 Joyce, Arthur A., and Marcus Winter. 1996. Ideology, Power, and Urban Society in Pre-Hispanic Oaxaca. Current Anthropology 37 (1):33-47.
 Meissner, Nathan J., Katherine E. South, Andrew K. Balkansky. 2013. Figurine Embodiment and Household Ritual in an Early Mixtec Village. Journal de la Société des Américanistes 99 (1):7-44.
 Nagengast, Carole, and Michael Kearney. 1990. Mixtec Ethnicity: Social Identity, Political Consciousness, and Political Activism. Latin American Research Review 25 92):61-91.
 Perez Rodriguez, Veronica. 2006. States and Households: The Social Organization of Terrace Agriculture in Postclassic Mixteca Alta, Oaxaca, Mexico. Latin American Antiquity 17 (1):3-22.
 Spores, Ronald. 1964. The Genealogy of Tlazultepec: A Sixteenth Century Mixtec Manuscript. Southwestern Journal of Archaeology 20 (1): 15-31.
 Spores, Ronald. 1974. Marital Alliance in the Political Integration of Mixtec Kingdoms. American Anthropologist 76 (2):297-311.

Theses and Dissertations 
 Ahern, Frances. 1993. Pottery Stylistic Variation among Coastal Mixtec and Amuzgo: An Ethnoarchaeological Study. PhD dissertation, State University of New York, Stony Brook.
 Alexander, Wynona W. 1981. An Assessment of Mixtec Gold and Silversmithing Technology. PhD dissertation, University of North Texas.
 Balkansky, Andrew K. 1997. Archaeological Settlement Patterns of the Sola Valley, Oaxaca, Mexico. PhD dissertation, University of Wisconsin-Madison.
 Bellas, Monica L. 1997. The Body in the Mixtec Codices: Birth, Purification, Transformation and Death. PhD dissertation, University of California, Riverside.
 Browning, Anjalil. 2010. South of Hope: The Impacts of US - Mexican State-Level Restructuring and Faltering Corn Production on the Lives of Indigenous Zapotec Maize Farmers in Oaxaca, Mexico. PhD dissertation, University of California, Los Angeles.
 Brulotte, Ronda L. 2007. Revealing Artifacts: Prehispanic Replicas in a Oaxacan Woodcarving Town. PhD dissertation, University of Texas, Austin.
 Christensen, Alexander F. 1998. Biological Affinity in Prehispanic Oaxaca. PhD dissertation, Vanderbilt University.
 Edwards, Meghan E. 2009. Crafting Culture: Artisan Cooperatives in Oaxaca, Mexico. M.A. thesis, University of California, San Diego.
 Forde, Jaime E. 2006. Ideology, Identity, and Icons: A Study of Mixtec Polychrome Pottery from Late Postclassic Yucu Dzaa (Tututepec), Oaxaca, Mexico. M.A. thesis, University of Colorado, Boulder.
 Gandhi, Kashmira. 2010. Crafting Through the Storm: Oaxacan Women's Cooperatives and Gender Roles in Times of Turmoil. M.A. thesis, University of Wyoming.
 Hedgepeth, Jessica D. 2009. The Domestic Economy of Early Postclassic Rio Viejo, Oaxaca, Mexico: Daily Practices and Worldviews of a Commoner Community. M.A. thesis, University of Colorado, Boulder.
 Hernandez-Juarez, Martin. 2009. Changing Livelihoods among Low-Income and Rural Households in Oaxaca, Mexico. PhD dissertation, University of Wisconsin, Madison.
 Jayyousi, Thaer. 2008. Using Evolutionary Computation and Data Mining to Model the Emergence of Archaic Urban Centers. M.S. thesis, Wayne State University.
 Jennings, Sarah. 2010. Mold-Made Figurines of the Lower Rio Verde Valley, Oaxaca, Mexico: Insights into Popular Ideology in the Classic and Early Postclassic. M.A. thesis, University of Colorado, Boulder.
 Johnson, Nicholas C. 2005. The Format of the Pre-Hispanic Mixtec Historical Screenfold Manuscripts. PhD dissertation, Tulane University.
 Levine, Marc N. 2007. Linking Household and Polity at Late Postclassic period Yucu Dzaa (Tututepec), a Mixtec Capital on the Coast of Oaxaca, Mexico. PhD dissertation, University of Colorado, Boulder.
 Pohl, John M. 1984. The Earth Lords: Politics and Symbolism of the Mixtec Codices. PhD dissertation, University of California, Los Angeles.
 Romero-Mendez, Rodrigo. 2009. A Reference Grammar of Ayutla Mixe (Tukyo'm ayuujk). PhD dissertation, State University of New York, Buffalo.
 Smith, Marissa. 2010. Neoliberalism, Urban Expansion, and Political Change in Oaxaca, Mexico: The Creation of Gendered City Spaces. PhD dissertation, Arizona State University.
 Stiver, Laura R. 2001. Prehispanic Mixtec Settlement and State in the Teposcolula Valley of Oaxaca, Mexico. PhD dissertation, Vanderbilt University.
 Stokes, Phil. 1995. The Origins of the Mixtec "Lords": As Given in Their Own Histories. PhD dissertation, University of Essex, United Kingdom.
 Trogdon, Michelle L. 2010. Ways of Farming in the Nochixtlan Valley, Oaxaca, Mexico. M.A. thesis, University of Colorado, Boulder.
 Whittaker, Gordon. 1980. The Hieroglyphics of Monte Alban. PhD dissertation, Yale University.
 Williams, John N. 2009. Patterns of Tree Diversity in the Tropical Dry Forests of Pacific Coast Mexico. PhD dissertation, University of California, Davis.
 Williams, Robert L. 2009. Codex Zouche-Nuttall, Pages 1-41: Narrative Structure, Contents, and Chronologies. PhD dissertation, University of Texas, Austin.

References 

Archaeological sites in Oaxaca
Mesoamerican sites
Archaeological projects
Mixtec